Merilyn Gómez Pozos (born 11 December 1981) is a Mexican politician and lawyer affiliated with the Convergence. As of 2013 she served as Deputy of the LXII Legislature of the Mexican Congress representing Jalisco.

References

1981 births
Living people
Politicians from Guadalajara, Jalisco
Women members of the Chamber of Deputies (Mexico)
21st-century Mexican lawyers
Citizens' Movement (Mexico) politicians
Mexican women lawyers
21st-century Mexican politicians
21st-century Mexican women politicians
Deputies of the LXII Legislature of Mexico
Members of the Chamber of Deputies (Mexico) for Jalisco